The Canada Open in badminton is an international open held in Canada since 1957. The tournament is traditionally held every year in September.

In 1957 the Canadian Badminton Federation decided to open the Canadian National Championships and they were combined with the Canadian Open until 1961. In 1962 they were divided and held as separate tournaments. 2008 and 2009 the championships were held as Canadian International. From 2023 onwards, this will be a Super 500 tournament.

Previous winners

Canada National Championships and Canada Open together

Canadian Open

Performances by nation

Note

References

External links
BWF: 2006 results
BWF: 2007 results

 
Badminton tournaments in Canada
Recurring sporting events established in 1957
1957 establishments in Canada